Celino San Marco is a comune in the province of Brindisi in Apulia, on the south-east coast of Italy.  Its main economic activities are tourism and the growing of olives and grapes.

People
Albano Carrisi (b. 1943), singer

References

External links

Official website

 
Localities of Salento